The Total Airport Management System (TAMS) is an integrated airport management system which is now being used in Kuala Lumpur International Airport (KLIA).

The system interfaces and integrates the majority of electronic information within the airport, assuring maximum flow of information for operations, management and security. 

The integration also supports the business goals of providing an efficient, cost effective operation of KLIA as it is the nucleus on the Multimedia Super Corridor and as the precursor to the next generation of airports in Malaysia and the world.

Components
The TAMS consist of various independent systems such as Passenger Check In System that are linked by high speed fibre optic cable to form TAMS. Some of the components are:

Integrated ICT system
The TAMS is directly linked to the Crisis Control Center and also other parts of Multimedia Super Corridor via megabit fibre optic cables which are designed to provide a platform that will allow for easy integration and link to the other components of the Multimedia Super Corridor.

External links 

 TAMS. Total Airport Management System

Kuala Lumpur International Airport
Science and technology in Malaysia
Scientific organisations based in Malaysia